Evelyn Paget Graves, 9th Baron Graves (17 May 1926 – 6 December 2002), was an Australian farmer and peer.

Graves was born in Tasmania, Australia, and worked as a farmer. In 1994 he succeeded his second cousin as ninth Baron Graves. However, as this was an Irish peerage it did not entitle him to a seat in the House of Lords. Lord Graves married Marjorie Ann, OAM (1992), on 13 March 1957. He died on 6 December 2002, aged 76, leaving two sons (one deceased), two daughters and 10 grandchildren. He was succeeded in the barony by his son Timothy.

References

Kidd, Charles, Williamson, David (editors). Debrett's Peerage and Baronetage (1990 edition). New York: St Martin's Press, 1990.

1926 births
2002 deaths
People from Tasmania
Barons in the Peerage of Ireland